Tarso Fernando Herz Genro (born 6 March 1947) is a  Brazilian politician from the southern state of Rio Grande do Sul. A prominent associate of Luiz Inácio Lula da Silva, Genro was one of the most important leaders of the Workers' Party (PT) in the 2000s.

Biography 
Genro was born to a working-class family in São Borja, Rio Grande do Sul, Genro was active in politics from a young age. In the early 1980s, Genro was a spokesman for the Communist Revolutionary Party (PRC) along with his brother, Adelmo Genro Filho.

As a member of the Workers' Party (PT), he was elected deputy mayor of Porto Alegre by the "Popular Front", a list headed by Olívio Dutra, a fellow member of the PT. He accumulated the position of vice mayor with that of government secretary. In 1992, Genro was elected to the position of Mayor of Porto Alegre, though he lost reelection in 1996. In 1998, he was speculated to be a potential presidential candidate for the PT in the place of Lula, though Lula ended up running

As a result of the Mensalão scandal, Genro served the remainder of José Genoíno's term as party president in 2005. Ricardo Berzoini was elected to the post later that year.

Following his service as interim president, Genro was a top political adviser to Luiz Inácio Lula da Silva, former President of Brazil (2006–2010), during the contentious, but quite successful, 2006 Presidential campaign. On 16 March 2007, he became the new Minister of Justice in Lula's cabinet. In 2010, Genro was mentioned as a possible successor to Lula, though the PT nomination went to eventual winner Dilma Rousseff.

Personal life 
His daughter, Luciana Genro, is a prominent socialist politician in Brazil who served as the presidential candidate of the Socialism and Liberty Party (PSOL) in 2014. Fernando Marcel Genro Robaina, his grandson, is a former Brazilian footballer.

References

External links

Living people
1947 births
Mayors of Porto Alegre
Workers' Party (Brazil) politicians
Presidents of the Workers' Party (Brazil)
Education Ministers of Brazil
Governors of Rio Grande do Sul
Recipients of the Great Cross of the National Order of Scientific Merit (Brazil)
Jewish Brazilian politicians
Jewish socialists
Ministers of Justice of Brazil